Raj Comics is an Indian comic books publisher based in New Delhi, India. It published a line of Indian comic books through Raja Pocket Books since its foundation in 1984 by Rajkumar Gupta, Manoj Gupta and Sanjay Gupta. Some of its most well known characters include Nagraj, Super Commando Dhruva, Bhokal, Doga, Parmanu, Tiranga, Bankelal, Shakti, Inspector Steel, Ashwaraj, Bheriya and Anthony. Raj Comics is credited as being one of the leading comic book distributors in India.

Raja Pockets initially published pulp-fiction books. They had a highly-successful run and published critically acclaimed authors like Surender Mohan Pathak, Ved Prakash Sharma, Anil Mohan and Raja. At their peak, the books sold up to 1 million copies each. While Rajkumar Gupta always had a passion for crime-thrillers, his sons Sanjay Gupta and Manoj Gupta started collection Indian and International Comics from an early age and were always thrilled with the idea of creating original Indian Superheroes. One evening, while discussing the same, Rajkumar Gupta walked in on the conversation of the two brothers and thus, Raj Comics was born.

The company mainly publishes four types of comics; medieval fantasy, horror, mystery, and superhero comics, with a predominant focus on superhero content. Their comics are usually published in Hindi, with only a few titles and special editions in English. It has produced close to 35,000 comics to date and has been read by people in India and abroad. The company also publishes an online exclusive web series named Raj Rojana, with a new page uploaded every day.

Raj Comics publishes in multiple formats, which include e-book, print, and motion comics. The company also sells hardcovers of their old and new comics, as well as bundled collections of their characters.

In 2008, Raj Comics was the focus of a research project conducted through The Sarai Programme at CSDS's Sarai Media Lab. The resulting research was published as a free PDF on the Sarai website.

Team 

 Vivek Mohan (Editor)
 Anupam Sinha (Creative Director)
 Tarun Kumar Wahi (Chief Writer)
 Jolly Sinha (Writer)
 Ajit Singh (Territory Manager)

Characters

Members of team Brahmand Rakshak (Protectors of the Universe) 
 Bheriya 
 Nagraj
 Super Commando Dhruva
 Doga
 Parmanu
 Shakti
 Inspector Steel
 Tiranga
 Super Indian
 Pret Uncle
 Ashwaraj
 Bhokal
 Anthony

Members of team Research and Investigation Paranormalism [RIP] 
 Gagan
 Vinashdoot
 Monty
 Tahira

Characters based in ancient times 
 Bhokal
 Gojo
 Ashwaraj
 Yoddha
 Tilismadev
 Prachanda
 Shukral
 Adig

Comedy characters 
 Bankelal
 Gamraj
 Fighter Toads

Chhota Nagraj and Amazing Friends of Nagraj
Vishaank/Chhota Nagraj
Sillu/Cybro
Shama/Flemina
Durdamya Sena Panchnaag- Naagdev, Sarpraj, Naagpreti, Sinhanaag and Naagarjun
Shooldharini Saudangi
Amar Yoddha Kaaldoot
Nag Veerangana Visarpi

Kids Series characters (Defunct)
Bobby
Tuffy
Cherry
Damru
Anadi

Member of Vistrit Rakshak (Extended Protectors of the Universe) 
Ninjadev Kirigi
Nakshatra
Samri
Dhananjay
Chandika
Jingaalu
Faceless
Visarpi
Kaaldoot
Blackcat
Pralayanka
Cancer

Members of W.A.R (World Allied Rescuers) 
Badman
Nakshatra
Kali Vidhwa
Inspector Cheetah
Sheena
Black Cat
Lomri
Madam X
Kirtiman
Adrishya Hatyara
Vanputra
Doctor Vargis

Member of P.V.N (Paralaukik Vigyan Nayakgan)
Vedacharya
Facelace (Bharti)
Kapalkundli
Nostradamus
Lori
Kishore
Saza(Venu)
Red Letter(Vikram)
Baby
Iri

Superheroes from Different World 
 Narak Nashak Nagraj
 Krodh Ketu Kobi
 Danadan Doga
 Doga Reborn
 Swatantrata Senani Dhruva
 Show Stopper Dhruva
 Ant henn Anthony

Newest characters 
 Sanju ( 10 Deadliest )
 Yugam ( Sarvnayak Series) ( Akhri Series)
 Adig ( Sarvnayak Series) ( Akhri Series)
 Paryaava ( Sarvnayak Series) ( Akhri Series)
 Aghori ( Sarvnayak Series) ( Aghori Agyat) 
 Narakputra raksh ( Sarvnayak Series)

Inactive characters 
 Goldheart
 Hunter Sharks
 Jaadugar
 Khayali Ram
 Raja
 Johar
 Barrister Vishwanath
 Aglu Pichlu
 Khaleel Khan
 Bhootnaath
 Anadi
 Vakra (After HUM HONGEY KAMYAB)

Inactive characters who came after a long time 
 Bobby
 Tuffy
 Cherry
 Damru
 Abhedya
 Blind Death
 Liza 
 Vega
 Jasoos Topichand
 Piddi Pahalwan
 Sanju (10 Deadliest)
 Fighter Toads
 Pret Uncle
 Tausi
 Bhootnaath ( Nutan Comics )(Sarvaayudh by Manoj Gupta)
 Raka ( Nutan Comics )(Sarvaayudh by Manoj Gupta)

TV show-based characters 
 Shaktimaan
 Viraat

History 

Raj Comics was founded in 1986 by Raj Kumar Gupta, Sanjay Gupta and Manoj Gupta. It marked the era of the rise of Indian superheroes. Raj Comics's first superhero was Nagraj. Later, they launched other popular superheroes like Dhruva, Doga, Parmanu, and Tiranga.

Origins 

Raj Comics' roots span back to the 1980s. After extreme dedication and perseverance by the brothers and their father, Raj Comics was propelled to great heights and fame. Nearly every teenager spent their afternoons glued to the latest comic addition. In the early days of its inception, Raj Comics published mythological, mystery and adventure comics. In 1985, Manoj Gupta, fueled by his passion and craze for western superheroes, notably Phantom, came up with the idea of creating a superhero centered around snakes as he believed snakes held a religious and mythological significance in India. Later, the team started working on the concept and finally created the Nagraj that we know today.

The Golden Age 
In 1997, an advertisement for Nagraj featuring Sonu Sood aired on TV.
During this era, Raj Comics reportedly sold over a million copies a year, making it one of the most widespread publications of that time period. It has sold more than 100 million copies since then.

Modern Age 

Raj Comics has now expanded to multiple different publication streams, with TriColor and other various business entities taking venerable steps in penetrating the Indian book market. Ongoing discussions with studio heads have been disclosed to the public about the possibility of live feature films based on their comic universe. However, nothing has since come to fruition.

In 2015, Raj Comics released an Android app for the general public. It has since garnered a massive following and has an average rating of 4.5+ stars.

In 2017, Raj Comics released a concept trailer for Nagraj on its official YouTube channel. It has since garnered over 1.5 million views.

In 2018, Raj Comics released a short feature film named Aadamkhor, partially self-produced and crowdfunded. It released on YouTube to critical acclaim by its audience.

Series

King Comics
King Comics was a line of comics published through Raja Pocket Books. While the division was initially successful, its popularity declined and the line went defunct after only about 2–5 years of activity. It was intended that many of King Comic's characters would be merged into Raj Comics, but only a few characters such as Gamraj were merged. During its run the division published six monthly comics.

Past and current series 
 Kaliyug (Shakti, Nagraj & Dhruva)
 Tune Mara doga ko (Doga) 
 Thrill-Horror-Suspense Series
 Huoooo-Series 
 X-Series
 Friendy Series 
 Goldheart Series
 Kaal Series (Ashwaraj, Gojo, Bhokal, TilismDev, Parmanu, Ins. Steel, Super Indian)
 Nagayan Series (Nagraj-Super Commando Dhruv)
 AmarPrem Series (Kobi-Bheriya-Bhokal)
 Japan Series (Atankharta Nagraj)
 City Without A Hero (Multistar)
 Khazana series (vishwa Rakshak Nagraj)
 Trifana Series (Nagraj)
 Maharavan Series (Bhokal)
 Dracula Series (Multistar)
 Narak Nashak Nagraj origin Series (Narak Nashak Nagraj)
 Crow Series (Anthony)
 Born In Blood Series (Doga)
 Express Way Series (Doga)
 Aatankawadi nagraj series (Multistarrer)
 Chamatakari bhokal series (Bhokal) 
 Mard aur murda series (Doga-antony) 
 Mahanagayan series
 Parmatma series (Parmanu) 
 Raktadaan series (Doga) 
 Jalyash series (Bankelal) 
 Tilismi olympic series (Bhokal) 
 Raj 20 (Amazing friends of nagraj) 
 Nagraj ke badd series (Nagraj) 
 Swarna nagri (Nagraj-Super Commando Dhruv- fighter toads)
 Belmunda ka khajana series (Nagraj-Super Commando Dhruv- Fighter Toads)
 Genius series (Super commando dhurva) 
 Aadamkhoro ka swaraga series (Super commando dhurva) 
 Axe series (Super commando dhurva) 
 Aakhri dhurva series (Super commando dhurva) 
 Pagal nagraj series (Nagraj) 
 Made in India series (Ins.Steel)
 Wafa series (Doga) 
 Doga diries series (Doga) 
 Doga collection series (Doga) 
 Mritiyjivi series (Narak nashak nagraj) 
 Makbara series (Narak nashak nagraj-gagan-Vinashdoot-tahira- Monty)
 Kar Bura ho Bhala series (Bankelal) 
 Aag series (Tiranga)
 Tandoor series (Doga) 
 Bankelal lok se lok series (bankelal) 
 Bankelal nagar se nagar series (Bankelal) 
 Nagina series (Nagraj) 
 Nahi bachega nagraj series (Nagraj) 
 Rajnagar rakshak series (Super commando dhurva- Ins. Steel)
 Curfew series (Doga) 
 Aarambha series (Yoddha)
 Hedron series (Nagraj-Super Commando Dhurva) 
 Champion killer series (Super commando dhurva)
 Guru bhokal series (Bhokal) 
 Game over series (Super commando dhurva) 
 Andhi maut series (Super commando dhurva) 
 Aagraj series (Nagraj) 
 Doga Hindu Hai Series (Doga) 
 Khoon series (Doga-Super Indian)
 Palra series (Multistarrer) 
 Mai hu bheriya series (Bheriya- Nagraj-Super Commando Dhruv - Doga- Parmanu)
 Ins.chetta series (Doga) 
 Nikal pada doga series (Doga) 
 Nagraj hai na series (Nagraj) 
 Lavva series (Nagraj) 
 Hatyara kaun series (Super commando dhurva) 
 Candakaal series (Super commando dhurva) 
 Khoni khandan series (Super commando dhurva) 
 Aab marega parmanu series (Parmanu)
 Lakshya purusha series (Doga) 
 Ek katora au Do Ktora Khoon series (Thrill-Horror-Suspense)
 Chamatakari bhokal series (Bhokal) 
 Jalyash series (Bankelal) 
 Germany series (Aatakharta nagraj)
 Italy series (Aatakharta nagraj)
 Raktabeej series (Multistarrer)
Doga unmulan series (Doga)
 Rajnagar Rakshak (Super Commando Dhruva, Inspector Steel)
 Akhiri-Last Survivors(Multistarrer)
 Balcharit (Origin Series of Super Commando Dhruva)
 Shaktiroopa (Follow up to Super Commando Dhruva's Balcharit)

Ongoing series 
 Sarvanayak (Nearly all major RC characters)
 Sarvanayak Vistar ( Multistarrer) 
 Kshatipoorti ( Aatankharta Nagraj)
 Sarpsatra (Vishwarakshak Nagraj)

Upcoming series 
 Prem Granth (Super Commando Dhruva)
 Naag Granth (Narak Nashak Nagraj and Krodh Ketu Kobi)
 Sins of the father (Anthony-Multistarrer)
 पुनरूत्थान (Multistarrer)
 महा-नागायण (Multistarrer)
 Shuddhikaran ( Kobi - Bhediya)
 Adharmeshwar (Multistarrer)
  अगड़म-बगड़म  (Bankeylal, Nagraj, Dhruv)
 फाइटर फोर्स (Fighter Toads)
 डेड गॉड्स (Multistarrer)
 नियो (Dhruv)

Social Comics 

 Nagraj Strikes: The Attack of the Coronaman
 Super Commando Dhruva: The Struggle with Depression

Jubilee and Kalpana-lok awards 
In 2010, Raj Comics celebrated its Silver Jubilee by launching the Kalpana-lok Awards to honor comics artists. Participants are nominated by editors at Raj Comics and can be voted on by readers and fans on the Raj Comics website.

Raj Comics films 
In 2014, Anurag Kashyap had spoken about making a film on Doga—a vigilante killing machine in the style of Marvel Comics’ The Punisher—but the project was shelved after his Bombay Velvet flopped. CEO Manish Gupta has had multiple ultimately unsuccessful meetings with prominent Bollywood industry personnel. In 2016, Raj Comics co-founder and studio head Sanjay Gupta said "Bollywood is yet to warm up to the idea of licensing comic book characters that come with detailed universes and visuals ready for the screen. We want to start with animated Web series first. We are expecting to make our first live-action film the year after.” In December 2017, Raj Comics organized special screening of their horror film Aadamkhor at Nagraj Janmotsav event, Delhi. Aadamkhor is based on comic of the same name published by Raj Comics in 1992.
Raj comics released Aadamkhor on YouTube on 24 May 2018.

In December 2019, Manoj Gupta said that he was in negotiations with Ranveer Singh to play Nagraj in a film produced by Karan Johar.

Digital distribution 
Raj Comics are available in digital form through their android app.
The Raj Comics official android app has reached over 100k+ downloads at the time of this article.
Free Services: In 2017, Raj Comics started free comics from their android app.

Paid Services: Google Play in 2017. RC Android app crossed 100,000 downloads within 6 months of its launch.

Legal history 
In 1996, delivered by the Delhi High Court under docket Raja Pocket Books (Plaintiff) v. Radha Pocket Books, Raj Comics won this intellectual property case with a ruling of "prima facie infringement of the plaintiff’s character."

References

Further reading

External links
 
 

 
1986 comics debuts
Magazines published in Delhi
Magazines established in 1986
Comic book publishing companies of India
Indian comics
Superhero comics
Indian comics titles